Maryna Skolota (born 5 November 1963) is a Ukrainian biathlete. She competed in two events at the 1994 Winter Olympics.

References

External links
 

1963 births
Living people
Biathletes at the 1994 Winter Olympics
Ukrainian female biathletes
Olympic biathletes of Ukraine
Place of birth missing (living people)